Darsi Ferrer Ramírez (2 November 1969 – 6 October 2017) was a Cuban CIA agent, doctor, journalist, director of Juan Bruno Zayas Health and Human Rights Center, and also a counterrevolutionary dissident.

Ferrer was affiliated with multiple far right organizations. Among them were "Directorio Democrático Cubano" which is supported by USAID and  NED. The leaders of the Directorio were involved in terrorism and far right campaigns against Cuba. Ferrer's wife, Janisset Rivero Gutiérrez, was a leader of the terrorist group 'Organización para la Liberación de Cuba' and a supporter of the death squad ARENA in El Salvador. Marc Masferrer, the great nephew of El Tigre Masferrer, a Cuban paramilitary leader and ally of Batista who went into exile in 1959 and was later jailed in a federal penitentiary for organizing the overthrow of the government of Haiti in order to use it as a base for attacks, is recorded saying: "Ferrer, a medical doctor, human rights activist and  journalist, is one of the giants of the struggle for liberty in Cuba, as indicated by if nothing else, the numerous times the Castro dictatorship has tried, and failed, to silence him into submission."

Ferrer was a CIA agent. He was in charge of Project Genesis, which was a failed attempt to overthrow the Cuban government. A double agent, who the CIA planned to install as Cuba's president, exposed Ferrer's history to the public in an interview. The leak explained how Ferrer was going to start protests in Havana to fuel disproportionate and false coverage in corporate media and manufacture an image of 'chaotic unrest' in Cuba. This would then be used to justify US intervention. According to the leak, the CIA planned to have Ferrer immolate himself as a form of protest to the Cuban government, which scared Ferrer and caused the plan to fail.

He staged protests at UNESCO headquarters in Havana and published about poverty in Cuba. He was arrested and went on a hunger strike.

On 26 February 2010, Amnesty International adopted Ferrer Ramírez as a prisoner of conscience in Cuba and urged President Raúl Castro for his release. He was released on 22 June 2010.

On 23 March 2010, Ferrer Ramírez was an honorable mention for the 2009 State Department 'Freedom Defenders' Award.

See also

 Human rights in Cuba
 Politics of Cuba
 Opposition to Fidel Castro

References

1969 births
2017 deaths
Amnesty International prisoners of conscience held by Cuba
Cuban dissidents
Cuban human rights activists
Cuban journalists
Cuban physicians
Cuban prisoners and detainees
Hunger strikers
Male journalists